Chinji National Park (shortened as Chinji), established in 1987, is a protected area of IUCN category II (national park) located on Sargodha road in Talagang Tehsil, Chakwal District, Punjab, Pakistan. Chinji National Park is located close to Salt Range, about 130 km from Islamabad in the south.

Landscape
The area has an elevation imperial of 2,231 feet (680 m). Deeply eroded land of Chinji consists of sandstone to igneous rocks, combined with small deposits of rock salt from the Salt Range. Deep torrential streams and ravines slope into the Soan River, which passes through the area.

Climate
Average annual rainfall in the area is 537 mm, out of which 308 mm is in the monsoon season from July to September. Maximum temperature is 27 °C in June and minimum is 2.2 °C in January. Frost is common in winter season. Relative humidity can reach up to 80% in monsoon.

Wildlife
The Chinji National Park exhibits the biome of deserts and xeric shrublands and falls in the ecoregion of 'Baluchistan xeric woodlands' (PA1307). The area is characterized to have sub-tropical vegetation with many plant species of importance. 
A few of the mammals found here include the Urial, Golden jackal, Bengal fox, Indian wolf and Indian pangolin. A few game birds include Grey francolin and Common wood pigeon

See also
List of national parks of Pakistan
Salt Range

References

External links
World Database On Protected Areas (WDPA) - Profile
Conservation of dry shrub forests in Salt Range - Planning report
wildlifeofpakistan.com

National parks of Pakistan
Protected areas established in 1987
Attock District
1987 establishments in Pakistan
Protected areas of Punjab, Pakistan

simple:Ayubia National Park